This is a list of notable Puerto Ricans who were awarded the Presidential Citizens Medal. The list includes people who were born in Puerto Rico, people who are of full or partial Puerto Rican ancestry, such as Victoria Leigh Soto whose father is Puerto Rican. It also includes other residents and/or immigrants of other ethnic heritages who have made Puerto Rico their home, and who are recognized for their life and/or work.

Three Puerto Ricans have been awarded the Presidential Citizens Medal. The Presidential Citizens Medal is an award bestowed by the President of the United States. It is the second highest civilian award in the United States, second only to the Presidential Medal of Freedom. Established on November 13, 1969, it recognizes individuals "who have performed exemplary deeds or services for his or her country or fellow citizens." The award is only eligible to United States citizens, and may be awarded posthumously.<ref
name="PCM">Library Thing - Presidential Citizens Medal</ref> Baseball Hall of Famer Roberto Clemente was also the posthumous recipient of the Congressional Gold Medal and the Presidential Medal of Freedom.

Recipients of the Presidential Citizens Medal
The following people are the recipients of the Presidential Citizens Medal:

See also

List of Puerto Ricans
List of Puerto Rican Presidential Medal of Freedom recipients
List of awards for volunteerism and community 
Service
 Puerto Rican recipients of the Medal of Honor
 Puerto Rican recipients of the Navy Cross
 Puerto Rican recipients of the Distinguished Service Cross
History of women in Puerto Rico

References

Lists of people from Puerto Rico
Presidential Citizens Medal recipients